Allen Kearns (14 August 1894 – 20 April 1956) was a Canadian-born singer and actor. He was born in Brockville, Ontario, Canada and died in Albany, New York. He played the romantic lead role in several Broadway musicals and is especially remembered for introducing two hit songs by George and Ira Gershwin: "'S Wonderful" (from Funny Face, 1927) and "Embraceable You" (from Girl Crazy, 1930).

Appearances

On stage 
 The Red Petticoat (1913)
 Miss Daisy (1914)
 Come Along (1919)
 Tickle Me (1921)
 Tangerine (1921)
 Lady Butterfly (1923)
 Little Jessie James (1923) (*with Miriam Hopkins)
 Mercenary Mary (1925)
 Tip-Toes (1925)
 Betsy (1926)
 Funny Face (1927)
 Here's Howe (1928)
 Hello, Daddy (1928)
 Girl Crazy (1930)
 A Divine Moment (1934)
 The American Way (1939)
 The Odds on Mrs. Oakley (1944)

On film 
 The Very Idea (1929) - Gilbert Goodhue
 Tanned Legs (1929) - Roger Fleming
 Lovin' the Ladies (1930) - Jimmy Farnsworth

Notes 

1894 births
1956 deaths
People from Brockville
Canadian male musical theatre actors
20th-century Canadian male singers
Canadian expatriate male actors in the United States